Island Park is a station on the Long Island Rail Road's Long Beach Branch serving the residents of Island Park, Barnum Island, and Harbor Isle. The station can platform a 12-car train and is fully wheelchair accessible with ramps from street level. Parking facilities are also available. Southwest of the station the train crosses over Reynolds Channel.

The average commute time between Island Park and Penn Station is 45–50 minutes. The average commute time between Island Park and Jamaica is 25–30 minutes.

History

Island Park station was built as a signal stop by the New York and Long Beach Railroad in April 1898 as The Dykes and served as a flag stop during much of the early 20th Century. In 1922, developer Edgewater Smith changed the name of the island from Jekyl Island to Island Park, however the name of the station wasn't changed until 1924, the previous name that replaced the former Jekyl Island Station (see below) to the north. The existing station building was built in May 1923.

Jekyl Island station 
Jekyll Island station was originally built in 1901 as Barnum Island station on the south side of the northern Long Beach Road grade crossing The station was renamed as Jekyl Island station in 1903, and then renamed "Island Park" station in October 1921. Due to an increase in development on the south side of the island, the station was closed in July 1922 and the name was moved to the site of the old flag stop formerly known as "The Dykes." The site of the former Jekyl Island Station is now occupied by a residential cul-de-sac named D'Amato Drive, which is only accessible from Parente Lane North.

Station layout
This station has two slightly offset high-level side platforms, each 10 cars long. Parking is largely restricted to Island Park residents, with permits issued by the village.

References

External links 

Photo from February 1999 (Unofficial LIRR History web site)
Station from Long Beach Road from Google Maps Street View
Platforms from Google Maps Street View
Station House (interior) from Google Maps Street View

Long Island Rail Road stations in Nassau County, New York
Railway stations in the United States opened in 1898
1898 establishments in New York (state)